Border Wars (2013) was a professional wrestling internet pay-per-view (iPPV) event produced by Ring of Honor (ROH) and Japanese Wrestling Promotion Pro Wrestling Noah. It took place on May 4, 2013, at the Ted Reeve Arena in Toronto, Ontario, Canada.

Storylines
Border Wars 2013 featured professional wrestling matches, which involved different wrestlers from pre-existing scripted feuds, plots, and storylines that played out on ROH's television programs. Wrestlers portrayed villains or heroes as they followed a series of events that built tension and culminated in a wrestling match or series of matches.

Results

See also

Professional wrestling in Canada

References

External links
ROHwrestling.com (official website)

2013
Ring of Honor pay-per-view events
Professional wrestling in Toronto
Pro Wrestling Noah shows
May 2013 events in Canada
2013 Ring of Honor pay-per-view events
2013 in Toronto
Events in Toronto